Dougall's formula may refer to one of two formulas for hypergeometric series, both named after John Dougall:
Dougall's formula for the sum of a 7F6 hypergeometric series
Dougall's formula for the sum of a bilateral hypergeometric series

Hypergeometric functions